Ludovico De Luigi (born 11 November 1933) is a contemporary Italian sculptor and painter born and living in Venice, Italy.

Career
De Luigi's first exhibition was in 1965 with his one-man show at the Gallery "Il Canale" in Venice which included two large works, views of a decaying and monumental Venice invaded by waves of insects and fantastical beings. Upon meeting with the gallery owner Luciano Ravagnan in 1968, De Luigi's exhibition activity increased in Venice and abroad. There were exhibitions in Trieste, Milan, New York, Munich, Monte Carlo, Paris and, beginning in 1975, in many German cities.

Alongside works with themes of Vedutism and entomology, he depicted threats which menace Venice: flood water, pollution, technology, and consumerism. Venice is represented in surreal visions, catastrophic, sensual or decadent, using an oil technique; the "electronic brush" of the computer is used later.

In the 1980s De Luigi produced sculptures, including enormous bronze horses inspired by the famous Triumphal Quadriga of St Mark's Basilica. De Luigi's horses are now in the squares of Marseille, St. Louis, Chicago, Denver, Perth and Bolzano. As of 2004, two of the horses were installed in the lobby of the Adam's Mark hotel in Saint Louis. For the Venice Carnival of 1990 he created a huge chocolate horse of the same dimensions. In 1999 he sculpted one in Murano glass.

Exhibitions 
1965
 Galleria II Canale, Venezia
1966
 Galleria II Traghetto 2,Venezia
1967
 Drake Gallery, Chicago
1968
 Galleria II Cannocchiale, Milano
1969
 Palazzo Costanzi VII° Festival Internazionale del Film di Fantascienza, Trieste
1970
 Galleria S. Stefano, Venezia
 Galleria d´Arte Moderna Ravagnan, Venezia
 Galleria del Sagittario, Milano
 GalleriaTraghetto, Venezia
1971
 Columbia University: Casa Italiana, New York
1973
 Galerie Margot Delfs, Munich
1974
 La Pagode, Paris 
 Kubus, Hannover
 One man GalleriaTommaseo, Trieste
1975
 Galleria Quarta Dimensione, Arezzo
Galleria d'Arte Moderna Ravagnan, Venezia
Istituto Italiano di Cultura, Cologne
Foyer des Grossen Hauses der Städt. Bühnen, Dortmund
Schulzentrum, Ludwigshafen am Rhein
Galerie Hennemann, Bonn
Kreissparkasse, Porz (Cologne)
Heimvolkshochschule, Lambrecht
Galerie Hennemann, Bonn
Galerie Hennemann, Bonn
1976
 Palazzo Braschi, Roma
 Galerie Moderne Art, Baldham
 Galerie Anastasia, Bensberg-Refrath
 Istituto Italiano di Cultura, Munich
 Kunstverein, Ingolstadt
 Gartensaal des Kursaalgebaudes, Bad Mergentheim
 Foyer des Stadttheaters, Münster
 Adebakademia, Mannheim
 Galerie Augustinum, Heidelberg
 Galerie Augustinum, Stuttgart
 Atelier für Kunstwissen, Baden-Baden
1978
 Musee du Bastion, Antibes
 Galerie Schmidel, Cologne
 Palazzo delle Prigioni Vecchie, Venezia
1979
 Galerie Konok, Saint-Etienne
 Museo de Arte Contemporaneo, Sevilla
 Museo de Arte Contemporaneo, Granada
 La casa de los Toros, Valencia
1980
 Museo de l’Atarazanas, Barcelona
 Galerie "89", Barcelona
 Fundació Joan Miró, Barcelona
 Foro de Arte Contemporaneo, Mexico City
1982
 Galleria Ravagnan, Venezia
 Galerie L´Eglantine, Lausanne
1983
 Palazzo Bagatti Valsecchi, Milan
 Galleria d´Arte Braidense, Milan
 Archives Municipals, Marseille
 Hotel de Ville, La Seyne Briancon
1984
 CKO, Oostend
 Padiglione del Parco Massari, Ferrara
1985
 Ca' Vendramin Calergi (S.I.M.A.), Venezia 
 "Scultura in tre tempi", Caffe Florian, Venezia
 Galerie du Vieux Villeneuve, Villeneuve
1986
 Museo de Arte Contemporaneo, Caracas
 Financial Place, Chicago
 Monument Main Lobby, 440 South La Salle, Chicago
1987
 Adam's Mark Gallery, Saint Louis
 Venice Design Art Gallery, Venezia
 GalleriaTreviso Artigiana
 Istituto Italiano di Cultura, Zagreb
1988
 Carrefour des Arts "Couvent du Refuge", Marseille
 Galleria d'Arte Moderna Ravagnan, Venezia
 "Ai Padovani", Carnevale dei Pittori, Venezia
 Palazzo delle Prigioni Vecchie, Venezia
 Galerie Francis, Gstaad
 "Ciasa de Ra Regoles", Cortina d’Ampezzo
1989
 Banca Popolare di Milano, Bergamo
 Galleria Giraldo, Treviso
 Galleria Opera, Belluno
 Galleria Il Traghetto, Venezia
 Premio Colonnette, Venezia
 Club Malvasia Vecchia, Venezia
 Studio Paolo Barozzi, Venezia
1990
 La Terrazza Cortina d'Ampezzo
 Galleria Traghetto II, Venezia

1994
 Art Fair, Gaunt
 Performance "Gondola Anfibia Carnevale di Venezia", Venezia
1995
 Caffe Quadri "Nuova Quadrigaper la Basilica di S. Marco", Venezia
 Torre Orologio Permanent Show, Venezia
1996
 Galerie Cadrama, Martigny
 Tonino Gallery, Campione d’Italia
1997
 Exposition Europa, Skulptur, Wiener Neustadt
1998
 Swisscom Center, Martigny
1999
 "Diamond-Marcus" Equestre monumentale in vetro di Murano, Venezia
2002
 Museo d´Arte Sant´Apollonia, Venezia
 Presentazione libro dell´artista "Palazzo Ducale", Venezia
2004
 Esposizione permanete Farnesina, Roma
2005
 Espace Pierre Cardin, Paris
 Contemporary Art at the Italian Pavilion Expo Aichi, Giappone
2006
 Spectrum Gallery "Impossible Venice", London
 Italian Cultural Institute, London
 Schloss Seefeld, Germany
 Galleria d'Arte Moderna Ravagnan, Venezia 
2007
 Venezia Impossibile, Museu Da Agua, Lisbon
2013
 Fondazione Bevilacqua La Masa, Venezia

References

Italian sculptors
Italian male sculptors
Living people
1933 births
Italian vedutisti